Mack and Myer for Hire is an American sitcom that aired in syndication from 1963 to 1964. The show starred Mickey Deems and Joey Faye, and was produced by Trans-Lux Television in New York. Each episode was approximately 12 minutes long, and the show was filmed using a two-camera layout. Over 100 episodes were produced during its only year in production, and these were re-run well into the 1970s. The series was produced by Sandy Howard and directed by Ted Devlet.

Premise
Mack and Myer are two handymen, doing jobs for hire. In one episode, they are seen doing things such as building a fence. However, their attempts at getting rich quick usually backfired, resulting in comedy. They were usually both unskilled and inexperienced in the work they were engaging in which provided much physical comedy opportunities. Sometimes the situations revolved around a common everyday problem (i.e., getting a good night's sleep).

Since each episode was approximately 12 minutes long, it was usually shown as part of a longer program. This was common at the time, as many stations across the United States would have shows, often hosted by clowns, which consisted of shorts such as Mack & Myer, Clutch Cargo and The Three Stooges combined with station-produced host segments. Like many sitcoms of the time, it featured a laugh track.

Although the production values were lacking compared with some other shows of the time, it proved popular with children, which kept the show repeated well-into the 1970s. It was also exported around the world, to countries such as West Germany and Australia.

DVD release and availability
Six episodes of the show were released on DVD by Alpha Video on August 22, 2006. These six episodes, believed to be in the public domain, can also be seen at the Internet Archive.

External links
 
 

1963 American television series debuts
1964 American television series endings
1960s American sitcoms
1960s American workplace comedy television series
Black-and-white American television shows
English-language television shows
First-run syndicated television programs in the United States
Television shows set in New York (state)